Seriously Deep is an album by of compositions by David Axelrod.

Original liner notes
Only a week after this album was finished, David and I sat down and played a dub of “Seriously Deep” for a college student.  She was a young girl who was certainly not aware of his work (or the success of it) in the past few years.  After nearly 40 minutes of intense listening, the album ended, and, as if language were no longer permitted, everything became very quiet.  David finally said, “Well?”  The girl looked across the coffee table, “It’s a pleasure to know you.”

Quite a few people have shared the sentiment of that college student.  Musicians who have known David’s work and have taken great pleasure in hearing no compromises . . . in having respect for a musician who has respect for his music.  On this album, you’ll hear ideas you’ve never heard before, including a tribute to an equally uncompromising filmmaker, Ken Russell.  Like his work, David’s music is too important to make changes – and that’s why, on this liner, you’ll find a list of some of the industry’s finest musicians who have played on this album only because they know David Axelrod.  They, the college student and myself agree, “It’s a pleasure to know you.”

--Jack Schnyder

Reissue summary
From Dusty Groove:
One of the rarest albums ever from funky maestro David Axelrod -- the producer known for his work with the Electric Prunes on Reprise, and a string of late 60s classics on Capitol Records! This mid 70s set for Polydor has Axelrod working in a jazz funk mode -- much more electric than before, with heavy keyboards from Crusader Joe Sample, thundering drums from Ndugu Chancler, reeds from Jerome Richardson and Ernie Watts, vibes from Gary Coleman, and a nice undercurrent of strings as well. There's a subtle dose of fusion in the mix, but one that's never too jamming -- and Axelrod always maintains his trademark sense of space and timing -- turning the simplest musical measure into the kind of groove that holds up well into the 21st Century. The album's a favorite of sample hounds and crate diggers, and is incredibly hard to find on vinyl.

Track listing
 All tracks composed, arranged, & conducted by David Axelrod

Personnel
Joe Sample - Arp Synthesizer, Clavinet, & Fender Rhodes
Jerome Richardson - soprano & tenor saxophone
Ernie Watts - flute, oboe, & tenor saxophone
Jay Migliori - baritone saxophone & flute
Gene Cipriano - tenor saxophone & flute
Gary Coleman - vibes
Billy Fender - guitars
John Morrell - guitars
Allen DeRienzo - trumpet
Snooky Young - trumpet
Jimmy Cleveland - trombone
Dick "Slyde" Hyde - trombone
Jim Hughart - bass
Leon "Ndugu" Chancler - drums
Mailto Correa - percussion
Jack Shulman - strings (concertmaster)

Solos
Jerome Richardson – soprano saxophone on “Miles Away”
Nathan Gershman – cello on “1000 Rads”
Billy Fender – guitar on “1000 Rads”
Ernie Watts – tenor saxophone “1000 Rads”, flute on “Ken Russell”, alto flute on “Reverie”

Technical personnel
Engineered by Maurice Leach
Produced by Jimmy Bowen & Cannonball Adderley

References

1975 albums
David Axelrod (musician) albums
Albums produced by Jimmy Bowen
Polydor Records albums